Blackwood Plateau is a part of the Blackwood River landscape between the Whicher Scarp and the Scott Coastal Plain in Southwest Australia. 

It is also known as the Donnybrook sunkland.

Notes

Blackwood River